Festina is a Spanish watch conglomerate. In 1985, businessman Miguel Rodríguez acquired Festina, a brand founded in Switzerland in 1902, thus forming the Festina-Lotus Group.

History

Festina was created in 1902 by the Stüdi family in the city of La Chaux-de-Fonds, in Switzerland. In 1935 the founding-family transmitted the brand to businessman, Willy Burkhard von Wilhelm.

During World War II, the company was based in Barcelona, Spain. In 1975, Georges Uhlmann, an entrepreneur who had a significant presence in the Spanish and Italian markets, acquired the firm. In 1984, the Spanish businessman Miguel Rodríguez, from La Linea de la Concepción (Cadiz), acquired the Festina brand and all its rights.

The Festina brand derived from the Latin "Festina lente" which means: "Make haste, slowly", a phrase that according to Roman historian, Suetonius, is attributed to Augustus Caesar, known for his prudence: "Walk slowly if you want to arrive at a well-done job sooner".

Within the Festina Group the brands Jaguar, Candino and Perrelet are Swiss-made. In 2002, Festina acquired the Swiss watch brand Candino.
In 2004, Festina acquired the luxury watch brand, Perrelet, founded in 1777 by the prestigious watchmaker Abraham-Louis Perrelet.

Marketing
In 1992, Festina became the official Timekeeper of the Tour de France until 2016, staying for decades closely linked to the world of cycling as a sponsor / timekeeper of the most important events of the cycling agenda (Tour of Spain, Tour of Britain, etc.).

In 2016, actor Gerard Butler became an ambassador of the brand and image of its campaigns worldwide thus moving its brand positioning towards the lifestyle category.

Festina Group 

With more than 30 years of history, Festina Group is today an international company specialized in the production and commercialization of commercial price range watches and precision parts.

The Group currently owns seven different brands of watches. Calypso, Lotus, Festina, Jaguar, Candino and two luxury brands Perrelet and L.Leroy. Festina also owns two jewelry brands, Lotus Style and Lotus Silver, to satisfy the demands of a wide range of public.

The Group's headquarters is located in Madrid, while the main production centers, owned by the Group, are located in Switzerland and Spain.
Today the Group, which has seven subsidiaries (France, Germany, Italy, Benelux, Switzerland, Czech Republic, Poland and Chile) is present in more than 90 countries on five continents with more than 5 million watches sold per year.

 Festina
 Candino
 Jaguar
 Perrelet 
 L.Leroy
 Joseph Chevalier
 Soprod - manufacturer of Swiss-made mechanical and quartz watch movements 
 Manufacture Horlogere de la Vallée de Joux (MHVJ)
 Calypso
 Lotus
 Kronaby

References

External links 
 
 Official US website

Manufacturing companies established in 1902
Watch brands
Spanish brands
Watch manufacturing companies of Spain
Manufacturing companies based in Barcelona